Neston South railway station was a station on the single track Hooton to West Kirby branch of the Birkenhead Railway, on the Wirral Peninsula, Cheshire, England. The station served the town of Neston.

History
The Birkenhead Railway, owned jointly by the Great Western Railway (GWR) and London and North Western Railway (LNWR), opened a branch line from Hooton to Parkgate on 1 October 1866. This was to serve the colliery near Neston and the residential area and bathing resort of Parkgate.
The railway was extended to West Kirby in 1886.

From its opening in 1866 until 1952, it was known simply as Neston railway station. Consisting of brick station buildings and two platforms, it was situated half a mile south east of Neston North railway station, which is now named Neston railway station. A factor which affected Neston South during its existence was being sited some distance away from the town centre. This was due to a dispute between the railway company and the local landowner the Earl of Shrewsbury.

Closure
Neston South railway station was closed to passengers on 17 September 1956. The track continued to be used for freight transportation and driver training for another six years, closing on 7 May 1962. The tracks were lifted two years later. The station buildings and platforms have been demolished and the site redeveloped for housing.

Wirral Country Park
The route became the Wirral Way footpath and part of Wirral Country Park in 1973, which was the first such designated site in Britain.

References

Further reading

External links

Disused railway stations in Cheshire
Former Birkenhead Railway stations
Railway stations in Great Britain opened in 1866
Railway stations in Great Britain closed in 1956
1866 establishments in England
Neston